Wenlan Hu Frost, (born 1958 in Chengdu, Sichuan, China) is an American painter living in Houston, Texas. 
She developed the Abstract Symbolism painting style in 2007 and is the first artist to present the Chinese character as a symbolic abstract art form on a Western medium, as seen in her Chinese Calligraphy 2.0 – The Love Character Abstract Symbolism Series.  

Her works are in the collection of the Butler Institute of American Art, where she had her first solo museum exhibition in 2008.

References

External links
 The Official Wenlan Hu Frost Web Page
 The Saatchi Gallery's Wenlan Hu Frost Web Page
 China Artist Association's Wenlan Hu Frost Web Page (Chinese)
 China Elite Magazine, August 2008 (Chinese)
 China Elite Magazine Cover, August 2008 (Chinese)
 China Collections Magazine, August 2008 (Chinese)

American contemporary painters
1958 births
Living people
American women painters
Painters from Texas
20th-century American painters
20th-century American women artists
American people of Chinese descent
21st-century American women artists